Replacement theory may refer to:

 Recent African origin of modern humans, in paleoanthropology, the dominant model of the geographic origin and early migration of anatomically modern humans
 The Great Replacement, a white nationalist conspiracy theory